The ABU TV Song Festival 2021 was the tenth annual edition of the ABU TV Song Festival.

Event

The non-competitive music showcase event was hosted in Kuala Lumpur, Malaysia as part of the 58th General Assembly of the Asia-Pacific Broadcasting Union (ABU). The program, as well as the entire general assembly, was held virtually for the second year in a row due to the COVID-19 pandemic.

The show was presented in-studio by TV and radio host Azura Zainal and commercial voice-over artist and emcee Sharizan Borhan. Each participating performance was pre-recorded and aired during the live stream.

Kazakh singer Dimash Kudaibergen, who performed for Kazakhstan in the 2015 and 2019 editions made a special appearance. He performed a cover of Kōji Tamaki's 1989 song "Ikanaide" (行かないで). The pre-recorded performance, also produced for the Tokyo Jazz Festival, was aired between the entries from Japan and Kazakhstan, the second and third participating acts, respectively.

List of participants

Ten countries were represented in the ABU Song Festival 2021, the lowest number of participants to date. China, Nepal, Turkmenistan, Uzbekistan, and Vanuatu did not return from last year's competition. Kazakhstan returned after a one-year hiatus.

See also 
 ABU TV Song Festival
 Asia-Pacific Broadcasting Union

References

External links
 

ABU Song Festivals
2021 song contests